Yakiv Georgievich Chernikhov (ukr. Яків Георгійович Чернихов) (5 (17) December 1889 in Pavlograd, Yekaterinoslav Governorate, Russian Empire (now Pavlohrad, Ukraine) – 9 May 1951 in Moscow, Soviet Union) was a Russian architect and graphic designer known for working in the constructivist style. As an architect, painter, graphic artist, and architectural theorist, his greatest contribution was in the genre of architectural fantasy — the Soviet version of  Claude Nicolas Ledoux, Giovanni Battista Piranesi, and Antonio Sant'Elia all at once.  His books on architectural design published in Leningrad between 1927 and 1933 are sometimes regarded amongst the most innovative texts (and illustrations) of their time.

Early life 
Chernikhov was born to a poor  family, one of 11 children. After studying at the Grekov Odessa Art school, Ukraine, where his teachers  were Gennady Ladyzhensky and Kiriyak Kostandi, leading artists of the South Russian school, he moved in 1914 to Petrograd (St. Petersburg) and joined the Architecture faculty of the Imperial Academy of Arts in 1916, where he later studied under Leon Benois.

Career 
Greatly interested in futurist movements, including constructivism, and the suprematism of Malevich (with whom he was acquainted), he set out his ideas in a series of books and scholarly works in the late 1920s and early 1930s, including:
 Osnovy sovremennoi arkhitektury (Fundamentals of Contemporary Architecture, 1930)
 Entazis i fust kolonny (Entasis and Shaft of the Column) 
 Tsvet i svet (Color and Light) 
 Estetika arkhitektury (Aesthetics of Architecture)  
 Krasota v arkhitekture (Beauty in Architecture)
 The Art of Graphic Representation (1927)
 Analiz postroeniia klassicheskogo shrifta [Analysis of the Formation of Classical Fonts]
 Konstruktsii arkhitekturnykh i mashinnykh form (The Construction of Architectural and Machine Forms,1931)
 Arkhitekturnye fantazii. 101 kompozitsiia (101 Architectural Fantasies, 1933).

In the first of the books, Osnovy sovremennoi arkhitektury he was already anticipating the appearance of several great skyscrapers of the future: the Palace of the Soviets (1932), the Moscow University building on Vorob’yovye (Sparrow) Hills (1955).

The 101 Architectural Fantasies, a very fine example of colour printing, was perhaps the last avant-garde art book to be published in Russia during the Stalinist era. Its remarkable designs uncannily predict the architecture of the later 20th century. However his unusual ideas meant that Chernikhov was distrusted by the regime. Although he continued work as a teacher and held a number of one-man shows, few of his designs were built and very few appear to have survived. Amongst the latter is the tower of the 'Red Nailer' factory in St. Petersburg.

Chernikhov also produced a number of richly designed architectural fantasies of historic architecture, which were never exhibited in his lifetime. A book on 'The Construction of Letter Forms' containing some of his typographical designs, was published after his death, in 1959.

Chernikhov was a tireless advocate for the importance of literacy in graphics. He believed that competency in representational skills — descriptive geometry, and drawing — was as necessary for every person as the ordinary skills of literacy. In addition to his very productive studio work, Chernikhov taught 
in the system of special workers’ classes (rabfak), was on the faculty of the architecture and construction departments of several institutions of higher learning, and developed a methodology for training students quickly and effectively in the fundamentals of graphics.

Chernikhov produced some 17,000 drawings and projects and was dubbed the Soviet Piranesi. On 8 August 2006, it was announced that some hundreds of Chernikhov's drawings, with an estimated value of $1,300,000, had gone missing from the Russian State Archives. Some 274 have been recovered, in Russia and abroad.

See also
 List of Russian artists
 Constructivist architecture

References

Sources
Russian Constructivism and Iakov Chernikhov. Architectural Design magazine vol. 59 no. 7–8, London, 1989
Documenti e Riproduzioni dall'Archivio di Aleksej e Dimitri Cernihov (Illustrated) ed. Carlo Olmo and Alessandro de Magistris, publisher Umberto Allemandi, 1995, in Italian
Graphic Masterpieces of Yakov Georgievich Chernikhov: The Collection of Dmitry Chernikhov by Dmitry Y. Chernikhov DOM Publishers 2008 in English
 Chernikov Fantasy and Construction: Iakov Chernikov's Approach to Architectural Design (Architectural Design Profile) by Catherine Cooke, Iakov Chernikhov. St Martins Press, London 1985

Literature
Berkovich, Gary. Reclaiming a History. Jewish Architects in Imperial Russia and the USSR. Volume 2. Soviet Avant-garde: 1917–1933. Weimar und Rostock: Grunberg Verlag. 2021. Pp. 134-136.

External links
Iakov Chernikov International Foundation

Russian avant-garde
Constructivist architects
Soviet architects
Russian architects
People from Pavlohrad
1889 births
1951 deaths
Modernist architecture in Russia
20th-century Russian artists